The 882d Bombardment Squadron is a former United States Army Air Forces unit.  It was organized in November 1943 and, after training in the United States, deployed to the Pacific Ocean Theater of World War II, where it participated in the strategic bombing campaign against Japan.  It earned two Distinguished Unit Citations before the end of the war.  The squadron returned to the United States in the fall of 1945 and was inactivated at March Field, California  in January 1946.

History
The 882d Bombardment Squadron was activated at Gowen Field, Idaho on 20 November 1943 as one of the four original squadrons of the 500th Bombardment Group.  It initially flew Boeing B-17 Flying Fortress bombers in New Mexico, then trained in Kansas with early model Boeing B-29 Superfortresses, with frequent delays in training due to modifications of the aircraft correcting production deficiencies..  It departed for its combat station in the Pacific in July 1944 after completing training.

The squadron arrived at its combat station, Isely Field, on Saipan in the Mariana Islands in September 1944.  It flew its first combat mission against a submarine base in the Truk Islands on 11 November.  Thirteen days later it participated in the first attack on the Japanese homeland from the Marianas.  Initially, the squadron flew high altitude daylight raids against industrial targets in Japan.  In January 1945, it carried out an attack on the Mitsubishi engine manufacturing plant in Nagoya, for which it was awarded a Distinguished Unit Citation (DUC).

The squadron was briefly diverted from its strategic mission when it struck airfields in Kyushu to support Operation Iceberg, the landings on Okinawa in April 1945.  Beginning in March 1945, Twentieth Air Force changed both its tactics and strategy and the squadron began carrying out nighttime attacks with incendiaries against area targets.  It received its second DUC for attacks on the urban and industrial section of Osaka, feeder industries at Hamamatsu and shipping and rail targets on Kyushu in June 1945. During the closing days of the war, the squadron also dropped propaganda leaflets over the Japanese home islands.

Following V-J Day, the squadron dropped food and supply to prisoners of war in Japan, Korea, China and Taiwan.  The squadron returned to the United States in the fall of 1945 and was inactivated at March Field, California on 17 January 1946.

Lineage
 Constituted as the 882d Bombardment Squadron, Very Heavy on 19 November 1943
 Activated on 20 November 1943
 Inactivated on 17 January 1946

Assignments
 500th Bombardment Group, 20 November 1943-17 January 1946

Stations
 Gowen Field, Idaho, 20 November 1943
 Clovis Army Air Field, New Mexico, c. 16 December 1943
 Walker Army Air Field, Kansas, 16 April–23 July 1944
 Isely Field, Saipan, Mariana Islands, 19 September 1944 – 15 November 1945
 March Field, California, 29 November 1945 – 17 January 1946

Aircraft
 Boeing B-17 Flying Fortress, 1944
 Boeing B-29 Superfortress, 1944–1945

Awards and campaigns

See also

 List of B-29 Superfortress operators
 B-17 Flying Fortress units of the United States Army Air Forces

References

Notes

Bibliography

 
 

Strategic bombing squadrons of the United States Army Air Forces
Military units and formations established in 1943